Lee Seok-hoon (born February 21, 1984) is a South Korean singer and a member of the trio SG Wannabe. He is also active as a solo artist and musical actor. Alongside his solo activities, he has appeared on various music variety shows such as Immortal Songs: Singing the Legend, King of Mask Singer, Fantastic Duo, Duet Song Festival, Vocal Play and Miss Back as either a performer or a guest judge.

Early life
Born in Pohang, Lee was raised in Incheon and attended Dong-ah Institute of Media and Arts, where he was a student of Kim Yeon-woo. Before debuting with SG Wannabe he had worked as a backing vocalist and vocal coach and was a frequent performer in the Hongdae area's club scene. He was already known to music industry scouts for his singing ability by the time he auditioned to join SG Wannabe.

Career
With the impending departure of Chae Dong-ha from SG Wannabe, the group's label Mnet Media secretly held an audition to find his replacement and Lee heard about it by word of mouth from notable producer and composer Kim Do-hoon, now co-CEO of RBW. At that time, he was planning to debut as a solo artist and had contributed a soundtrack for the SBS drama Lovers. He was selected out of several hundred candidates and officially revealed by the label as the new member in April 2008. His first appearance was in the group's fifth studio album My Friend. Because Chae had abruptly left the group in the midst of preparing for the album, Lee only had several months to rehearse and record his parts and film the music video for the lead single "Lalala".

In 2009 Lee was a guest cast member on We Got Married 2 where he was paired with Kim Na-young after his bandmate Kim Yong-jun asked him to go on a blind date. In 2010 he became the first member to go solo with the release of his EP Greeting, which received positive reviews and also performed well in the Gaon Charts. The EP was originally intended to be a full-length studio album but some of the unfinished tracks were accidentally deleted. The songs "Station" (정거장) and "Ten Reasons I Love You" (그대를 사랑하는 10가지 이유) remained in the Gaon Digital Chart for over two months. From 2011 to 2015, SG Wannabe was on hiatus as each member focused on his solo career and fulfilled their mandatory military service obligations. Lee released his second EP and participated in several popular drama soundtracks. He also went into radio and was the regular DJ of SBS Power FM's late night program Ten Ten Club from 2011 to 2012 and a relief DJ on various radio programs over the years.

In January 2013 Lee enlisted for mandatory military service and was initially designated as a "celebrity soldier" assigned exclusively to public relations duties. After a series of controversies involving several of his contemporaries, the system was abolished that same year and all celebrities in the unit were designated as infantrymen and sent to various infantry units. Lee was assigned to the 7th Infantry Division based in Hwacheon County, Gangwon Province and discharged in October 2014. With SG Wannabe preparing their comeback, he focused his attention on group activities as the members were much more involved with the production and composition process.

Lee was one of the two main vocal trainers in Mnet's survival programs Produce 101 (season 2) (2017) and Produce X 101 (2019). After his appearances on the Produce 101 franchise programs, some of his previous releases have seen renewed interest, with "Ten Reasons I Love You" becoming a popular noraebang (karaoke) song, placing in the Gaon Noraebang Chart since 2017 and being named by several commentators in their list of best songs to sing in a noraebang. In 2017 he made his solo comeback with the release of his third EP, featuring the song "She", which he dedicated to his wife, as the lead single. He composed and released the song "It Was You" (너였구나) to celebrate the birth of their son the following year. In 2018 Lee made his debut in musical theater and was cast as the male lead in Kinky Boots. In 2019 Lee recorded one of the longest winning streaks on King of Mask Singer, winning the crown and then defending it a record five consecutive times. He was double-cast in the popular Korean adaptation of The Man Who Laughs as Gwynplaine, the male lead, in its second run from January to March 2020. His critically acclaimed performance won him a nomination for the Best New Male Actor at the 5th Korean Musical Awards. 

For the early half of 2021 Lee was a guest DJ for various radio programs, including covering for Jun Hyo-seong when she was in self-isolation after coming into contact with a suspected COVID-19 case. He was cast in Marie Antoinette as the eponymous character's friend Swedish nobleman Axel von Fersen the Younger; the critically-acclaimed domestic production ran for the third time and opened on July 13. In May, he returned to radio and took over Kang Susie as DJ for MBC's music-focused program Wonderful Radio.

On March 9, 2022, it was confirmed that Lee will release his first full album Same Place via SNS on March 24, 2022.

On October 21, 2022, it was announced that Lee will release his new album "ALIVE" on November 7.

Personal life
Lee is married to ballerina Choi Sun-a, a former member of the Korea National Ballet, and they have a son (born in August 2018). They first met on the MBC dating program Exciting Love Studio (두근두근 사랑의 스튜디오) in 2011 and continued their relationship off-screen. The couple secretly registered their marriage in 2014 while he was still in the army and later had a private wedding ceremony in January 2016.

Discography

Studio albums

Extended plays

Singles and charted songs

Songwriting credits 
Lee has 15 songwriting credits registered with the Korea Music Copyright Association (KOMCA). All credits are adapted from KOMCA, unless stated otherwise.

Theater

Filmography

Television show

Web shows

Radio shows

Music video appearances

Ambassadorship 
 Ambassador of Public Relations to Seoul (2023)

Awards and nominations

References

External Links
Profile on C9 Entertainment official website
Profile and discography on Melon

1984 births
Living people
MBK Entertainment artists
Jellyfish Entertainment artists
Musicians from Incheon
South Korean pop singers
South Korean contemporary R&B singers
South Korean television personalities
Kyung Hee University alumni
21st-century South Korean  male singers
South Korean male singer-songwriters
Dong-ah Institute of Media and Arts alumni